Hortence Vanessa Mballa Atangana (born 5 January 1992 in Bikok) is a Cameroonian judoka. At the 2016 Summer Olympics she competed in the Women's -78kg.

In 2019, she won the silver medal in the women's +78 kg event at the 2019 African Games held in Rabat, Morocco.

In 2021, she competed in the women's +78 kg event at the 2021 World Judo Championships held in Budapest, Hungary.

At the 2020 Summer Olympics, she competed in the women's +78kg event.

References

External links
 
 
 
 

Olympic judoka of Cameroon
1992 births
Judoka at the 2016 Summer Olympics
Living people
Cameroonian female judoka
African Games bronze medalists for Cameroon
African Games medalists in judo
Competitors at the 2015 African Games
Competitors at the 2019 African Games
African Games silver medalists for Cameroon
Judoka at the 2014 Commonwealth Games
Commonwealth Games bronze medallists for Cameroon
Commonwealth Games medallists in judo
Judoka at the 2020 Summer Olympics
21st-century Cameroonian women
Medallists at the 2014 Commonwealth Games